Coleophora polichomriensis is a moth of the family Coleophoridae. It is found in Afghanistan and Pakistan.

References

polichomriensis
Moths of Asia
Moths described in 1967